Dr. Hadi-Khan Mahabadi is a member of the Order of Canada. As of 2012, he was the vice president of Xerox Research Centre of Canada. in 2010 he was one of the recipients of the Top 25 Canadian Immigrant Awards presented by Canadian Immigrant Magazine.

References

Living people
Officers of the Order of Canada
Year of birth missing (living people)
Place of birth missing (living people)